Benjamin Sapida (born March 31, 1987), whose previous screen name was Vince Saldaña and current screen name is Benjamin Alves, is a Filipino actor and model under the management of GMA Network.

Biography

Early life
Alves was born Benjamin Quiambao Sapida on March 31, 1987 in Guam. Alves is a nephew of Filipino actor Piolo Pascual.

Vince Saldaña (2006–2009)
In 2006, Alves went to the Philippines to pursue a modeling career. He entered showbusiness with the screen name Vince Saldaña back in 2008 and appeared in ABS-CBN's reality model-search competition Close-Up to Fame where he eventually became a finalist. He then signed up in VIVA and got his first acting gig in QTV's teen series Posh in 2007. In that same year, he appeared in other Viva Films movies like Ang Cute ng Ina Mo and Apat Dapat, Dapat Apat. He also starred on soap operas Dalawang Tisoy in RPN 9, Ysabella on ABS-CBN and Impostora on GMA Network. Apart from his work on television series and films, Alves also appeared in various TV commercials and magazines. He was supposed to be one of the cast of GMA Network's L.U.V. Pow but was withdrawn after the cast reboot. Alves left show business in 2009 to continue his studies.

In 2012, Alves graduated Summa cum laude at the University of Guam with a degree in English Literature. From a press interview, he revealed that he wanted to in pursue a master's degree but decided to stay on with his showbiz career.

Benjamin Alves and contract with GMA Network (2012–present)
Saldaña was relaunched into show business as Benjamin Alves by Mercator Model and Artist Management. He signed an exclusive contract to GMA Network signing a 3 movie outfit and soap operas. He was officially launched in a Sunday variety show, Party Pilipinas on June 25, 2012 as the newest Kapuso star, and was also dubbed as the newest Kapuso heartthrob. His first movie will be under Regal Films entitled Guni-Guni playing as Paolo Lopez. He will act as a love interest of actress, Lovi Poe. He will also appear on GMA Films's entry to the 2012 Metro Manila Film Festival, Coño Problems. In August 2012, Alves was announced as one of the casts for the remake of the famous Korean television series, Coffee Prince. He acted as Errol, a record-producer and half-brother of Abrenica.

In 2013, he starred in the film Sana Dati an Independent film starring TJ Trinidad, Lovi Poe and Paulo Avelino.

Personal life
Alves used to be in a relationship with singer and actress Julie Anne San Jose from May 2016 to November 2018. The relationship was confirmed by San Jose on January 7, 2017. It was only in January 2019, however, that San Jose publicly confirmed their breakup.

Filmography

Television series

Television shows

Film

Accolades

Notes

References

External links

https://www.gmanetwork.com/sparkle/artists/benjamin_alves

1987 births
Living people
Filipino male film actors
Filipino male television actors
Guamanian people of Filipino descent
GMA Network personalities
ABS-CBN personalities
Star Magic personalities